Polyortha is a genus of moths belonging to the family Tortricidae.

Species

Polyortha atroperla  Razowski, 1980
Polyortha biezankoi  Becker, 1970
Polyortha bryographa  Meyrick, 1909
Polyortha bryometalla  Meyrick, 1932
Polyortha chiriquitana  Zeller, 1877
Polyortha chlamydata  Dognin, 1912
Polyortha clarkeana  Razowski, 1984
Polyortha euchlorana  Walsingham, 1914
Polyortha evestigana  Razowski, 1984
Polyortha glaucotes  Walsingham, 1914 
Polyortha gradatulana  Zeller, 1866
Polyortha halianassa  Meyrick, 1932
Polyortha larocae  Razowski & Becker, 1981
Polyortha lyncurion  Razowski, 1980
Polyortha maculata  Razowski, 1999
Polyortha magnifica  Walsingham, 1914
Polyortha marmarodes  Meyrick, 1912
Polyortha myoxa  Razowski, 1984
Polyortha naevifera  Razowski, 1984
Polyortha nigriguttata  Walsingham, 1914
Polyortha niveopunctata  Dognin, 1905
Polyortha paranae  Razowski & Becker, 1981
Polyortha purpurascens  Meyrick, 1912
Polyortha radiata  Razowski & Becker, 1981
Polyortha sagax  Razowski, 1984
Polyortha suffalcata  Walsingham, 1914
Polyortha symphyla  Razowski, 1984
Polyortha tersa  Walsingham, 1914
Polyortha thammiana  Zeller, 1877
Polyortha trochilodes  Meyrick, 1912

References

 , 1991: Tortricidae (Lepidoptera) from Ecuador. Acta Zoologica cracoviensia 42 (2): 321-342.

External links
tortricidae.com

 
Polyorthini
Tortricidae genera